Najib Tareque, (born September 5, 1970, as Abu Najib Mohammed Tareque) is a Bengali artist, printmaker and writer based on Dhaka, Bangladesh. He is best known for her New media artworks and one of the pioneers of online art galleries in Bangladesh. Tareque was the founding member of Jolrong, one of the first online art galleries in South Asia. Since 1987, he has been part of various group and solo exhibitions both in the country and abroad. He participates more than twenty individual and joint exhibitions in the country and abroad.

In 1998 he was awarded by the Forest Department of the Ministry of Environment, Forest and Climate Change.

Early life
Abu Najib Mohammad Tareque was born on 5 September 1970, in Borogur Gola, Dinajpur, East Pakistan (now Bangladesh). His father was Tamizuddin and mother Nujratun Nisa. Tareque is the fifth among seven siblings. By his father's career, his childhood and early life span in Thakurgaon, Rajshahi and in Dinajpur district.

His early education began in the village's school. After completing school exam from Rajshahi Collegiate School in 1986, he studied Dinajpur Government College. In 1987, he admitted studying Printmaking in Faculty of Fine Arts of the University of Dhaka. He was graduated in 1994 and after finished post graduation in 2000 from the faculty. While being a student, he was merely acting in the movement against anti-autocracy movement, and for the Nirmul Committee.

Career
Tareque worked as a chief artist for such national newspapers, including Daily Jugantor from 1999 to 2001 and Daily Janakantha from 2002 to 2004. He also worked with Ekushey Television from 2001 to 2003. From 2004 to 2011, he was also appointed as a brand marketing consultant of the Standard Chartered Bank Limited in Dhaka. Besides, he has been appointed as the Information Technology Secretary of the Bangladesh Charushilpi Sangsad.

Works

Tareque is mainly a printmaker. However, he did numerous work in the several mediums including oil, water, and acrylic, but he mostly on the mix-media. Tareque's earlier works highlighted nature, structure, figures, sketches, and portrait became the subject of his paintings. His portraits and figures are considered as semi-realistic and often surrealistic or impressionistic. Most of his paintings have vibrant colours, and the backgrounds are moving is dominant. Initially, multivariate fragility noted in his paintings that often reminds the artworks of the Fauvist artists. Paul Klee's painting are often remembered when analyzing the space and intention of  Tareque's painting "Antarer Anusandhan" and "Naree Banam Naree". Tareque has often used the Arabic alphabet and the use of words in the art of painting. Tareque has tried to create own art form mainly by synthesizing different doctrines of paintings rather than a specific one. There is a logical appreciation about the life of artist Tareque in the opening words: "God is amorphous, inactive, and absolute emptiness, religions are the historic events for the human society, which increasingly becoming history. Those who have a lack of knowledge of history are either religious, maybe anti-religious, or antipathetic."

In 1994, two of his solo exhibitions were organized. "Joy Manabata" is his first solo exhibition which was held in May 1994 with Alliance Française in Dhaka. Most of the 42 paintings of the exhibition were the subject matter of the human. Where the human form has been depicted in the form of Durga, Nomad, Ravana, Ullas, etc. Some paintings of Tareque, who believe in the Evolution theory, are found in the resemblance of the non-human face with the human body, through which he has expressed his desire to illustrate the ugly image of the human.

In 2009, he participated in the group exhibition held in Mumbai, India. He got acquainted with the illustration of book covers and literary magazines, dissiging of clothing, etc. In Bangladesh, he tried to turn the traditional illustrations of the book covers into modern art.

In 2015, Tareque took an initiative to create an artists hub and launched a gallery Studio 6/6 at Mohammedpur, Dhaka, when the co-founder was his daughter Taiara Farhana Tareque. After initial launch of the studio has hosted several exhibitions, workshops, and events featuring artists from different talents, as musicians, painters, writers etc.

"Art Makes Us Human"

Online-based conceptual virtual art project Art Makes Us Human starts since July 2015 through the social media Instagram. Later in May 2016, a solo exhibition of the project was organized in the Studio 6/6 Gallery located in Dhaka. It was first physical exhibition of its kind in the country, with around 15 physical prints of digital paintings. As a part of the project, Tareque composed his old and new combination of decoration, using many of his previously drawn illustrations for various books, newspapers and magazines. The colourful artworks mostly using bold strokes, striking colours and enthralling patterns to create human faces and figures, birds and different geometric forms. Since its online launching nearly more than 1500 artworks are published under the project, in various social media including Instagram, Pinterest, Tumblr, and Facebook.

Personal life
Najib married Bangladeshi painter Farhana Afroz Bappy. They have a daughter Taiara Farhana Tareque (born 1994), she is also a young artist, and a son Farhand Abu Tamjiad. In 2015, the artist family launched Studio 6/6, an art spaces based in Dhaka.

In April 2017, a joint exhibition of this couple was organized in Dhaka at their own art gallery named Studio 6/6 under the heading "Nirman" ("Construction").

Notable exhibitions

Solo exhibition

Joint exhibitions

Cover illustrations
 Ghorer Latim Ar Sutar Jaymity Dhaka Tolpet (2010)
 Bokkhapinjor Bonam Ostho Ar Chokhbondher Kobita (2015)
 And Those Other Ghosts Of Love (2016)
 Ishwarer Sontanera (February 2017; Kotha Prakash)

Literary works
Apart from composing art, Tareque has studied literature; wrote verse, essay, discussion, etc. In 1996, he wrote Kobitar Chitrayon Proshonge about painting and literature, published under the Young Writer' Project of Bangla Academy. He also published two volume of drawings books for the children.

Bibliography
 Dhil Mari Tor Tiner Chale (1992)
 Kobitar Chitrayon Proshonge (1996, Bangla Academy)
 Maddhomiker Khero Khata (December 2018, Prokriti)

Awards
 1995 - National Miniature Art Exhibition
 1995 - UN's 50th Anniversary Youth Artist's Art Competition, Bangladesh Shilpakala Academy
 1997 - 2nd Berger Painting Award Exhibition
 1998 - 3rd Berger Painting Award Exhibition
 1998 - International Miniature Art Exhibition
 1998 - International Ozone Day Department of Forestry, Ministry of Environment, Forest and Climate Change

See also
 Studio 6/6
 List of Bangladeshi painters

Notes

References

External links

 

Living people
1970 births
New media artists
Mixed-media artists
Bengali male artists
Bangladeshi conceptual artists
Bangladeshi portrait painters
Bangladeshi illustrators
Bangladeshi printmakers
20th-century Bangladeshi painters
20th-century male artists
21st-century Bangladeshi painters
21st-century male artists
20th-century painters
21st-century painters
Artist authors
Artists from Dhaka
People from Dinajpur District, Bangladesh
University of Dhaka Faculty of Fine Arts alumni
Dinajpur Government College alumni
Rajshahi Collegiate School alumni